Yves is the ninth single album from South Korean girl group Loona's pre-debut project. It was released digitally on November 28 by Blockberry Creative. It officially introduces member Yves and contains two tracks, "New" and "D-1".

Track listing 

Credits adapted from Melon.

Charts

References

External links
 
 Yves at Melon 

2017 singles
Loona (group) albums
Single albums
Blockberry Creative singles